Thomas Chisenga (born 8 April 1969) is a Zambian boxer. He competed in the men's light flyweight event at the 1988 Summer Olympics.

References

External links
 

1969 births
Living people
Zambian male boxers
Olympic boxers of Zambia
Boxers at the 1988 Summer Olympics
Place of birth missing (living people)
Light-flyweight boxers